Music teacher Kristine Fitzhugh (born 1947) was murdered on May 5, 2000 in her home in Palo Alto, California by her husband Kenneth Carroll Fitzhugh Jr. (19432012).

After Kenneth Fitzhugh received a call from Kristine's workplace saying that she had failed to meet her classes, he and two coworkers went to the family house, where they found Kristine dead at the bottom of the basement stairs.

Crime 

Kenneth suggested Kristine fell on the stairs because she was wearing a pair of dangerously unsteady shoes, but water-diluted blood in the kitchen showed that she had been killed therehit on the head seven times and strangledthen placed at the bottom of the stairs. 
Kenneth, a real estate agent, claimed he was miles away inspecting property at the time of the murder, but cell phone records showed that he received a call around the time of the murder while in the Fitzhughs' neighborhood. A search of Kenneth's car found clothing, shoes and other items stained with Kristine's blood.

Sentence 

In 2001, Kenneth Fitzhugh was convicted of second-degree murder and sentenced to 15 years to life. The motive for the murder is uncertain. Kenneth may have been angry that Kristine was about to reveal to her eldest son that his biological father was not Kenneth; a DNA test conducted after the murder confirmed this. In addition, had he not been convicted, Kenneth would have collected $96,000 from Kristine's life insurance and some or all of her $900,000 estate.

Aftermath 

Fitzhugh was paroled on compassionate grounds in February 2012 due to Parkinson's disease, and died in Palo Alto on October 27, 2012, at age 69.

References

External links
 Kristine Fitzhugh murder story archive, from Palo Alto Weekly News

1947 births
2000 deaths
People murdered in California
People from Palo Alto, California
American murder victims
Deaths by person in California
2000 murders in the United States
2000 in California
Deaths by strangulation in the United States
Uxoricides